Männersachen (German for: "Guys' Stuff") is a studio album by German jazz musician Roger Cicero. The album was released on May 26, 2006 for the German record label Starwatch Music and is distributed through Warner Music Group throughout the world. The album marked Cicero's debut success as a solo artist reaching the charts top 40 in Switzerland, Austria and Germany. It received an Echo in 2007 and was certified with multiple gold awards in Germany and Austria.

It was re-released on March 9, 2007 and this time, included his Eurovision entry Frauen regier'n die Welt".

Critical reception
AllMusic critic James Christopher Monger calls the release an "impressive debut," that "offers up 14 tracks that show off the son of renowned jazz pianist Eugen Cicero's gift for phrasing and clever arrangements". He recommends this album for people that like Michael Bublé's music or "contemporary swing in general". German music critic and journalist Frank Ehrlacher thinks that the album may not be "revolutionary", but notes the excellent musical work that can be heard on the release. In his review for CD Lexikon, Ehrlacher criticized the fact, that Cicero did not write many of the album's songs.

Accolades

Track listing

Chart performance

Weekly charts

Year-end charts

Certifications

References

External links

Roger Cicero discography (German)
Official Roger Cicero Website (German)

2006 albums
Roger Cicero albums
German-language albums
Echo (music award) winners